Following is the list of energy efficient buildings according to climatic zones they are situated in.

Climatic zones

Cold and sunny
 Degree College and Hill Council Complex, Leh
 Airport and staff housing colony, Kargil
 LEDeG Trainees’ Hostel, Leh
 Sarai for Tabo Gompa, Spiti
 The Druk White Lotus School, Shey, Ladakh

Cold And Cloudy
 Residence of Mohini Mullick, Bhowali, Nainital
 Himachal Pradesh State Co-operative Bank, Shimla
 MLA Hostel, Shimla
 Himurja Office Building, Shimla

Composite

 Bidani House, Faridabad
 Centre for Science and Environment (CSE), New Delhi
 Transport Corporation of India Ltd, Gurgaon
 SOS Tibetan Children's Village, Rajpur, Dehradun
 Redevelopment of property at Civil Lines, Delhi
 Integrated Rural Energy Programme Training Centre, Delhi
 Tapasya Block (Phase 1), Sri Aurobindo Ashram, New Delhi
 Water and Land Management Institute, Bhopal
 Baptist Church, Chandigarh
 Solar Energy Centre, Gwal Pahari, Gurgaon
 National Media Centre Co-operative Housing Scheme, Gurgaon 
 ITC Centre, Gurgaon 
 CII - Sohrabji Godrej Green Business Centre, Hyderabad
 Monama House, Hyderabad
 Green Leaf Hotel, Jasola

Hot and dry
 Indian Institute of Health Management Research, Jaipur
 Sangath – an architect's studio, Ahmedabad
 Torrent Research Centre, Ahmedabad
 Residence for Mahendra Patel, Ahmedabad
 Solar passive hostel, Jodhpur
 college of engineering, Phaltan

Moderate
 Residence for Mary Mathew, Bangalore
 TERI office building-cum-guest house, Bangalore

Warm and humid
 Nisha's play School, Goa
 Office building of the West Bengal Renewable Energy Development Agency, Kolkata
 Office-cum-laboratory for the West Bengal Pollution Control Board, Kolkata
 Silent Valley, Kalasa
 Vikas Apartments, Auroville
 La Cuisine Solaire, Auroville
 Kindergarten School, Auroville
 Visitors’ Centre, Auroville
 Computer Maintenance Corporation House, Mumbai
 Dormitory Building, Karjat

See also

Green building in India
Energy Conservation Building Code
Solar power in India
India Environment Portal
 Energy-efficient buildings – a business case for India? An analysis of incremental costs for four building projects of the Energy-Efficient Homes Programme, 2015

References

Energy conservation in India
Energy efficient